Cherokee society (  in the Cherokee language) is the culture and societal structures shared by the Cherokee Peoples. It can also mean the extended family or village. The Cherokee are Indigenous to the mountain and inland regions of the southeastern United States in the areas of present-day North Carolina, and historically in South Carolina, Tennessee, Virginia, and Georgia. The majority of the tribe was forcefully removed to Indian Territory in Oklahoma in the 1830s.

The three federally recognized Cherokee tribes are: the Cherokee Nation of Oklahoma (CNO), the United Keetoowah Band of Cherokee Indians (UKB)  also in Oklahoma, and the Eastern Band of Cherokee Indians (EBCI) consisting of the Cherokee who remained in North Carolina.

The three Tribes
The community of the Eastern Band of Cherokee Indians' headquarters are in the town of Cherokee, North Carolina, on the Qualla Boundary, while the Cherokee Nation and the United Keetoowah Band are both centered in Tahlequah, Oklahoma, where their ancestors had developed after removal in the 1830s.  According to local legend, after the Cherokee reached this area on the Trail of Tears, three tribal elders had scheduled a rendezvous near present-day Tahlequah in order to select a site to settle and use as the seat of tribal government. Two elders arrived and waited for the third. After waiting until dusk, they decided "two is enough" (Ta'ligwu). In Cherokee, "Ta'li" represents the number two and "gwu" means "it's enough", or translated as "Two is enough". This legend purportedly began in the 1930s. A more likely origin is the ancient eastern Cherokee town of Great Tellico, spelled Talikwa in Cherokee. Still others trace it to the word tel-i-quah, which is interpreted as "plains". But there is no specific word for "plains" in any current Cherokee lexicon.

Seven Cherokee Clans

Cherokee society has traditionally been grouped around a social organization of seven clans. 
These are:
Blue (also Panther or Wild Cat) Clan (ᎠᏂᏌᎰᏂ (a-ni-sa-ho-ni) in Cherokee)
Long Hair (also Twister, Hair Hanging Down, or Wind) Clan (ᎠᏂᎩᎶᎯ (ah-ni-gi-lo-hi) in Cherokee), wore their hair in elaborate hairdos, walked in a proud and vain manner twisting their shoulders. The Peace Chief was usually from this clan.
Bird Clan (ᎠᏂᏥᏍᏆ (a-ni-tsi-s-qua) in Cherokee) 
Paint Clan (ᎠᏂᏬᏗ (a-ni-wo-di) in Cherokee), made red paint 
Deer Clan (ᎠᏂᎠᏫ (a-ni-a-wi) in Cherokee), were known as fast runners and hunters.
Wild Potato (also Bear, Raccoon, or Blind Savannah) Clan (ᎠᏂᎦᏙᎨᏫ (a-ni-ga-do-ge-wi) in Cherokee), gathered the wild potato for food from swamps along streams.
Wolf Clan (ᎠᏂᏩᏯ (a-ni-wa-ya) in Cherokee), was the largest and most prominent clan, providing most of the tribe's war chiefs. 

The clan provided many important functions, including care for orphans and the destitute, and hospitality for visiting clan members from other towns.  This practice was referred to as Gadugi (Syllabary:ᎦᏚᎩ) in ancient times.

Villages/government

Each village of the Cherokee had two governmental units: a white and red government. The white government was in power primarily beginning with spring planting season and maintained control over domestic affairs. There is evidence indicating that both men and women filled the role of chief. In the fall, which was considered the  time of war, duties then generally fell on the red government.

White government
The white government consisted of the Peace Chief, an advisor, prime counselors (one from each clan unit), a council of elders, a chief speaker, messengers, and ceremonial officers.  This  organization made the decisions that guided the tribe during their times of peace, including domestic issues and ceremonies.

Red government
The red government consisted of a Great War Chief, the Great War Chief's Second, seven War Counselors, a War Woman or "Beloved Woman", the Chief War Speaker, Messengers, Ceremonial Officers, and War Scouts.  The seven war counselors were in charge of declaring war when they felt the circumstances made it necessary.  The War Woman and Grandmother Elders would declare the fate of captives and prisoners taken in times of war.

Council House
The Cherokee towns had a large meeting house called a Council House or ga-tu-yi(ᎦᏚᏱ). The Council House was the center of government for each town; it had seven sides, which provided the same number of sections, so that each clan had a place for its representatives within the governmental structure. The seven sections of seats surrounded the sacred fire. Weddings and other meetings were also held within the Council House.

Family
The Cherokee are traditionally a matrilineal kinship society, in which property and social status have historically descended through the women's line. To traditional Cherokee, a child is considered born into their mother's family and clan; the most important man in the life of these children is their mother's eldest brother.

Naming
A person's name given at birth might be changed later in life, to mark major passages or events. A person might earn a new name through an outstanding act or a great accomplishment, or after passing puberty.

Blood law 

The blood law system of justice was usually carried out by the oldest brother of the victim, or by an older male relative from the victim's clan. 

In 1808 the people created the Lighthorsemen as the chief law enforcement of the Nation, until they were reformed in 1817. By 1825 the Lighthorseman were replaced by Marshals, Sheriffs and Constables to respond to a demand for more structured law enforcement along the European-American model.

Ceremonies

There are seven primary ceremonies celebrated by the Cherokee, but smaller subsequent ceremonies and or extension of primary ceremonies are also practiced. They are as follows: New Moon Festival (First Festival), Green Corn Ceremony (Second Festival), Ripe Corn Ceremony (Third Festival), Great New Moon Ceremony (Fourth Festival), Friends Made Ceremony (Fifth Festival also known as Propitiation Festival), Bounding Bush Ceremony (Sixth Festival) and the Uku or Ookah Dance(Only performed every 7 years).

Dances
Traditional Cherokee have both social and ceremonial dances. Some surviving dances may now be held for different purposes than they had historically. As with many cultures, the Cherokee have also been influenced by neighboring cultures.
Cherokee Dances included the Booger Dance, Stomp Dance, War Dance, a victory dance called the Eagle Tail Dance, Ant Dance, Bear Dance, Beaver Hunting Dance, Friendship Dance, Forest Buffalo Dance and Uka Dance.

Traditional use of masks

Some Cherokee traditional dances involve masks.  The Booger Dance masks represent various faces of the enemies of the Cherokee. They may be made from large gourds, hornets nests, buckeye, or poplar wood. Masks inspired by the traditional Booger Masks have been mass-produced and sold to tourists in various locations.

The Bear Dance, Beaver Dance, and Forest Buffalo Dances may also employ masks.

See also

Cherokee mythology
Green Corn Ceremony
Unto These Hills
Ani-kutani
Stomp Dance
Wild onion festival

Footnotes

References
Reed, Marcelina. Seven Clans of the Cherokee Society. Cherokee Publications. First Edition, .
Mails, Thomas E. The Cherokee People:... Council Oak Books

External links
Official Site of the Cherokee Nation
Official Site of the Eastern Band of Cherokee Indians
Official Site of the Keetoowah Band of Cherokee